Caffaro may refer to:
Caffaro  (river), a river in north Italy
Caffaro di Rustico da Caschifellone (c.1080–c.1164), a Genoan crusader and chronicler
Caffaro, manufacturer of bearings and rolls in Poland

See also
 Cafaro, a surname